Martin Grenier (born November 2, 1980) is a Canadian former professional ice hockey defenceman who played in the National Hockey League (NHL) for the Phoenix Coyotes, Vancouver Canucks, and Philadelphia Flyers.

Playing career
As a youth, Grenier played in the 1994 Quebec International Pee-Wee Hockey Tournament with the Sélects-du-Nord minor ice hockey team.

Drafted by the Colorado Avalanche 45th overall in the 1999 NHL Entry Draft, Grenier was traded to the Boston Bruins along with Brian Rolston, Samuel Pahlsson and a 2000 1st round draft pick for Ray Bourque and Dave Andreychuk on March 6, 2000. Left unsigned by Boston, Grenier signed with the Phoenix Coyotes prior to the 2001–02 season. Since beginning his pro career, he has spent most of his time in the AHL with a few callups to the NHL with the Coyotes, Vancouver Canucks, and Philadelphia Flyers.

In the 2008–09 season, Grenier signed with the newly formed KHL, joining Traktor Chelyabinsk and establishing himself as one of the league's premier fighters.

On June 18, 2011, Grenier was made the second selection of the 2011 LNAH Draft.

Career statistics

References

External links
 
Martin Grenier's Blog at Mediazavod.ru

1980 births
Living people
Canadian ice hockey defencemen
Charlotte Checkers (1993–2010) players
Colorado Avalanche draft picks
Hartford Wolf Pack players
Sportspeople from Laval, Quebec
Manitoba Moose players
Philadelphia Flyers players
Philadelphia Phantoms players
Phoenix Coyotes players
Quebec Remparts players
Springfield Falcons players
Traktor Chelyabinsk players
Vancouver Canucks players
Victoriaville Tigres players
Ice hockey people from Quebec
Canadian expatriate ice hockey players in Russia
20th-century Canadian people
21st-century Canadian people